Cossayuna is a hamlet in Washington County, New York, United States. Cossayuna has a post office with ZIP code 12823.

References

Hamlets in Washington County, New York
Hamlets in New York (state)